Tim Sedlacek is a retired American soccer forward who played professionally in the Major Indoor Soccer League, American Soccer League and American Indoor Soccer Association.

Player
In 1979, Sedlacek signed with the Seattle Sounders of the North American Soccer League.  He spent two years with the Sounders' reserve team.  In the fall of 1981, he moved indoors with the Phoenix Inferno of the Major Indoor Soccer League.  In 1982, he joined the Dallas Americans of the American Soccer League.  In 1984, Sedlacek signed with the Milwaukee Wave of the American Indoor Soccer Association.  He played two season with the Wave before finishing his career with the Louisville Thunder in 1988.

Coach
Sedlacek spent two years coaching Fife High School.  He also served as an assistant coach at Highline Community College before becoming head coach in November 1990.

External links
 MISL stats
 Career overview

Living people
1961 births
Soccer players from Seattle
American soccer players
American Indoor Soccer Association players
American Soccer League (1933–1983) players
Dallas Americans players
Louisville Thunder players
Major Indoor Soccer League (1978–1992) players
Milwaukee Wave players
Phoenix Inferno players
Association football forwards
Seattle Sounders (1974–1983) players